Jeffrey Dean Isbell (born April 8, 1962), best known as Izzy Stradlin, is an American guitarist. He was a co-founder and rhythm guitarist of the hard rock and heavy metal band Guns N' Roses, which he left at the height of their fame in 1991, and with whom he recorded four studio albums.

Following his departure from Guns N' Roses, Stradlin fronted his own rock band Izzy Stradlin and the Ju Ju Hounds, before continuing to record as a solo artist. He was inducted into the Rock and Roll Hall of Fame as a member of Guns N' Roses in 2012.

Life and career

Early life 
Stradlin was born as Jeffrey Dean Isbell in Indiana.
His father, Richard Clyde Isbell, was an engraver and his mother, Sonja LaVern Isbell, née Reagan, worked for a phone company. They divorced when he was eight  and his mother moved with Stradlin and his two younger brothers, Kevin Thomas Isbell and Joseph "Joe" Isbell to Lafayette, Indiana.
His father remarried in 1975 and had two daughters with his new wife.
Of his hometown, Stradlin later said, "It was cool growing up there. There's a courthouse and a college, a river and railroad tracks. It's a small town, so there wasn't much to do. We rode bikes, smoked pot, got into trouble - it was pretty Beavis and Butt-Head actually."

Stradlin developed an interest in music early in life; by the age of eight, his musical favorites included Bob Dylan, Pink Floyd, Alice Cooper, and Led Zeppelin. His biggest musical influence was his paternal grandmother, who played drums in a swing jazz band with her friends. Inspired, Stradlin talked his parents into buying him a drum kit.

In high school, Stradlin started a band with his friends, one of whom was singer William Bailey, later known as Axl Rose. Stradlin recalled, "We were long-haired guys in high school. You were either a jock or a stoner. We weren't jocks, so we ended up hanging out together. We'd play covers in the garage. There were no clubs to play at, so we never made it out of the garage." Despite his aversion to school, Stradlin graduated in 1980 with a D average, the only original member of Guns N' Roses with a high school diploma. Set on a career in music, he subsequently moved to Los Angeles, California.

1980–1984: Career beginnings 
Shortly after his arrival in Los Angeles, Stradlin joined punk band Naughty Women. During his ill-fated first show with the band, audience members began attacking the musicians; Stradlin recalled, "I just grabbed a cymbal stand and stood on the side trying to fend them off, yelling, 'Get the fuck away from me, man!' That was my introduction to the rock scene in L.A." His two-month tenure in Naughty Women was followed by a stint in punk band The Atoms, before his drum kit was stolen from his car and he switched to bass. Stradlin then joined the heavy metal band Shire, during which he took up rhythm guitar to aid his songwriting.

In 1983, Stradlin formed Hollywood Rose with his childhood friend Axl Rose, who had moved to Los Angeles the previous year. In January 1984, the band recorded a five-song demo featuring the tracks "Killing Time", "Anything Goes", "Rocker", "Shadow of Your Love", and "Reckless Life", which were released in 2004 as part of the compilation album The Roots of Guns N' Roses. The group disbanded in August, following which Stradlin briefly joined Sunset Strip staple London. He also formed the short-lived band Stalin with singer Eric Leach and guitarist Taz Rudd of Symbol Six. In December, he reunited with Hollywood Rose.

1985–1991: Guns N' Roses 

In March 1985, Stradlin founded Guns N' Roses with Axl Rose and members of L.A. Guns, Tracii Guns, Ole Beich and Rob Gardner, as a favor to L.A. Guns manager, Raz Cue, who had previously booked the act at the Troubadour. By June, the lineup consisted of Rose, guitarist Slash, rhythm guitarist Stradlin, bassist Duff McKagan, and drummer Steven Adler. They played nightclubs—such as the Whisky a Go Go, The Roxy, and The Troubadour—and opened for larger acts throughout 1985 and 1986. During this period, the band wrote much of its classic material, and Stradlin established himself as a key songwriter.

In July 1987, Guns N' Roses released their debut album, Appetite for Destruction, which to date has sold over 28 million copies worldwide, including 18 million in the United States alone. Stradlin wrote or cowrote most of its songs, including the hits "Sweet Child o' Mine" and "Paradise City". He also wrote the hit "Patience" on the follow-up G N' R Lies, released in November 1988 to US sales of five million copies, despite containing only eight tracks, four of which were included on the previously released EP Live ?!*@ Like a Suicide.

As their success grew, so did tensions within the band. In 1989, opening for The Rolling Stones, Rose made an on-stage announcement in which he threatened to leave the band if Slash and Adler didn't stop "dancing with Mr. Brownstone," a reference to their song of the same name about heroin. After being sentenced to a year's probation for urinating in public aboard an airplane (after which the band nicknamed him "Whizzy"), Stradlin decided to attain sobriety; he returned to his house in Indiana, where he detoxed from drugs and alcohol. 
In September 1991, Guns N' Roses released the long-awaited Use Your Illusion I and Use Your Illusion II, which debuted at No. 2 and No. 1 respectively in the US chart – an unprecedented feat. Stradlin cowrote the hits "Don't Cry" and "You Could Be Mine", and performed lead vocals on "Dust N' Bones", "You Ain't the First", "Double Talkin' Jive", and "14 Years". As with their previous records, his preferred guitar during recording was a Gibson ES-175.

By the release of the Use Your Illusion albums, Stradlin had become dissatisfied with life in Guns N' Roses: "Once I quit drugs, I couldn't help looking around and asking myself, 'Is this all there is?' I was just tired of it; I needed to get out." On November 7, 1991, it was announced that he had left Guns N' Roses, having played his final show as an official member on August 31 at Wembley Stadium.

Stradlin later said, "I didn't like the complications that became such a part of daily life in Guns N' Roses," citing the Riverport riot and Axl Rose's chronic lateness and diva behavior on the Use Your Illusion Tour as examples. He also objected to a contract with which he was presented: "This is right before I left – demoting me to some lower position. They were gonna cut my percentage of royalties down. I was like, 'Fuck you! I've been there from Day One. Why should I do that? Fuck you, I'll go play the Whisky.' That's what happened. It was utterly insane."

Stradlin added that getting sober played a part in his decision to leave, saying, "When you're fucked up, you're more likely to put up with things you wouldn't normally put up with."

Some of Stradlin's guitar playing recorded during the Illusion sessions appears on Guns N' Roses's 1993 covers album "The Spaghetti Incident?", although he was uncredited on the project.

1992–1994: Ju Ju Hounds and first return to Guns N' Roses 

Following his departure from Guns N' Roses, Stradlin returned to his hometown of Lafayette, Indiana, where he began working on new material. He formed the band Izzy Stradlin and the Ju Ju Hounds, which consisted of Stradlin on vocals and rhythm guitar, Rick Richards of Georgia Satellites on lead guitar, Jimmy Ashhurst of Broken Homes on bass, and Charlie Quintana on drums. Their self-titled debut album was released in October 1992 to positive reviews; Rolling Stone called it "a ragged, blues-drenched, and thoroughly winning solo debut." Ju Ju Hounds played its first show in September at The Avalon in Chicago, before embarking on a tour of Europe, Australia, and North America.

In May 1993, Stradlin reunited with Guns N' Roses for five shows in Europe and the Middle East to fill in for his replacement, Gilby Clarke, who had broken his wrist in a motorcycle accident. After Stradlin returned to the Ju Ju Hounds, Axl Rose dedicated the Stradlin-penned "Double Talkin' Jive" to him during several shows. In September, the Ju Ju Hounds undertook a tour of Japan, where the band played its final show at the Shibuya Public Hall in Tokyo. Stradlin then took time off from music, during which he traveled extensively and dedicated much of his time to his other passion - motor racing, even building a track close to his Indiana home.

1995–2002: Solo career and Velvet Revolver 

In 1995, Stradlin began recording material for his first solo album, 117°. Released in March 1998, the album was recorded over a period of two years and featured his former bandmates Duff McKagan and Rick Richards, as well as former Reverend Horton Heat drummer Taz Bentley, whose work Stradlin admired. As before, Stradlin had little interest in promoting his music; he did few interviews and played no live performances. The album turned out to be his last release on his long-time label Geffen; as a result of the merge between Geffen and Interscope, Stradlin was dropped from the label's roster.

In December 1999, Stradlin's next solo album, Ride On, was released on the Universal Victor label in Japan. It featured the same lineup as his previous release. To promote the album, Stradlin - with McKagan, Richards, and Bentley— played four shows in Japan the following April. With the addition of keyboardist Ian McLagan, the group recorded two more albums: River, which was released in May 2001 on Sanctuary, and a second Japan-only release, On Down the Road, which followed in August 2002 on JVC Victor.

Stradlin was then asked by his former Guns N' Roses bandmates Duff McKagan, Slash, and Matt Sorum to join the supergroup Velvet Revolver. Although he contributed to the songwriting process while the band was in its formative stage, Stradlin ultimately declined to join due to his aversion to life on the road and his unwillingness to work with a lead singer, although he offered to share vocal duties with McKagan.

2003–2010: Independent solo career and second return to Guns N' Roses 
In 2003, Stradlin recorded his sixth album, Like a Dog, with guitarist Rick Richards, drummer Taz Bentley, and bassist JT Longoria. It was originally scheduled for a late 2003 release, with just under one thousand promo copies made. However, the album was not released until October 2005, when Stradlin — prompted by a fan petition—made it available through internet order. The following year, Stradlin re-released Ride On, River, On Down the Road, and Like a Dog through iTunes.

In May 2006, thirteen years after his last performance with Guns N' Roses, Stradlin made a guest appearance at the band's show at the Hammerstein Ballroom in New York; he played on "Patience", "Think About You", and "Nightrain". He then performed with Guns N' Roses for 13 shows during the band's summer European tour. Stradlin said, "Axl [Rose] and I connected via cell phone this year, I stopped by. It was nice to reconnect with an old friend/war buddy/fellow musician. I told him later I'd like to join the fun in some way and he said I was welcome to come and play something, so I did! Took me about three weeks to recover from the six weeks of touring!" In December, he played three shows with the group at the Gibson Amphitheatre in Universal City, California.

Stradlin released his seventh album, Miami, through iTunes in May 2007. It again featured Rick Richards, Taz Bentley, and JT Longoria, as well as keyboardist Joey Huffman. Guitarist Richards described the album as being "a bit of a departure from Like a Dog but still quite a rocker." In July, a remixed version of Miami was released through iTunes; Stradlin called the new mix "much louder and more powerful sounding." In November of that year, he released a second iTunes-only album, Fire, the Acoustic Album, which also featured Richards, Bentley, and Longoria.

Stradlin's next iTunes release, Concrete, came out in July 2008. In addition to his regular collaborators, Stradlin also invited Duff McKagan to play bass on three songs, including the title track. Stradlin then released two more albums through iTunes: Smoke, which came out in December 2009, and Wave of Heat, which followed in July 2010 and again featured McKagan, who appears on seven tracks. Also in 2010, Stradlin appeared as a guest on Slash's first solo album, Slash; he performs rhythm guitar on the first track, "Ghost".

2011–present: Hall of Fame induction and third return to Guns N' Roses 
In April 2012, Stradlin was inducted into the Rock and Roll Hall of Fame as a member of the classic lineup of Guns N' Roses. In a statement released through Duff McKagan's blog for Seattle Weekly, he thanked the Rock and Roll Hall of Fame "for the acknowledgement of our works over the years," his former bandmates, and his fans for their continuing support. Known to avoid public attention, Stradlin did not attend the induction ceremony.

In the month following the induction, Stradlin joined Guns N' Roses on stage during two shows at London's O2 Arena, where they performed a range of songs including "14 Years," which had not been performed live since his departure in 1991. He also performed with Guns N' Roses in July, at a private show in Saint-Tropez and a concert in Palma de Mallorca, and again in November, during the last two shows of the band's twelve-date "Appetite for Democracy" residency in Las Vegas. Also in November, Stradlin released the iTunes-only single "Baby-Rann"—his first release in over two years; an accompanying video was made available via YouTube.

Amidst rumors and speculation, Stradlin joined Twitter, and confirmed in a statement to Rolling Stone that he would not be involved with the 'reunited' Guns N' Roses lineup in 2016. He later stated that he declined because the band "didn't want to split the loot equally". In 2018, Alan Niven reported that Stradlin participated in a soundcheck with Guns N' Roses sometime in 2017, but ultimately left before guesting on the show. Stradlin also reportedly declined special guest appearances similar to the ones Adler had.

Stradlin released numerous singles in 2016, previewing samples of the songs via his Twitter account and through the YouTube channel 'classicrockstuffs'. "Sunshine" by Jonathon Edwards and "Stuck in the Middle with You" by Stealers Wheel were acoustic videos made available through YouTube, whilst "Walk N' Song", "F.P. Money" (featuring former Guns N' Roses drummer Matt Sorum), "To Being Alive" and a cover version of the J.J. Cale song "Call Me the Breeze "featuring Jesse Aycock and Lauren Barth, were released to online music stores.

In 2017, Stradlin played guitar on the song "Grandview" by John Mellencamp, on his album Sad Clowns & Hillbillies. Martina McBride was also featured on the song.

Personal life 

On May 29, 1995, in Indiana, Stradlin married then 31 year old Swedish biologist and environmentalist Annica Kreuter. The couple divorced in California in May 2001.

Izzy's grandfather's half-brother, Joseph William "Little Joe" Isbell, born in Bloomington Indiana, 1916 and died in 2008 was also a recording and touring artist, described as a "country yodeler".

In 2016, Stradlin still lived in California, in the Ojai Valley

Equipment 
Guitars: 
 ESP Eclipse Custom
 Gibson ES-175
 Gibson Byrdland 
 Gibson ES-135
 Gibson Les Paul Custom
 Fender Telecaster
 Gibson ES-355
 Gibson Les Paul Special Double Cutaway
Amps: 
 Mesa Boogie Mark Series Mark I and Mark IIB Coliseum 
 Fender Bassman heads with a Mesa Boogie 4x12 cabinet
 Marshall JCM-800

Discography

Studio albums
 117° (1998)
 Ride On (1999)
 River (2001)
 On Down the Road (2002)
 Like a Dog (2005)
 Miami (2007)
 Fire, the Acoustic Album (2007)
 Concrete (2008)
 Smoke (2009)
 Wave of Heat (2010)

with Guns N' Roses
 Appetite for Destruction (1987)
 G N' R Lies (1988)
 Use Your Illusion I (1991)
 Use Your Illusion II (1991)
 "The Spaghetti Incident?" (1993) (uncredited)

with The Ju Ju Hounds
 Pressure Drop EP (1992)
 Izzy Stradlin and the Ju Ju Hounds (1992)
 Izzy Stradlin and the Ju Ju Hounds Live EP (1993)

References

External links 

 
 

 
1962 births
20th-century American guitarists
20th-century American singers
21st-century American singers
American heavy metal guitarists
American male guitarists
American multi-instrumentalists
American rock songwriters
American rock singers
Guitarists from Indiana
Guitarists from Los Angeles
Guns N' Roses members
Hollywood Rose members
Rhythm guitarists
Living people
People from Lafayette, Indiana
Lead guitarists
Singers from Indiana
Singers from Los Angeles
Songwriters from California
Songwriters from Indiana